The 1939 Paris–Roubaix was the 40th edition of the Paris–Roubaix, a classic one-day cycle race in France. The single day event was held on 9 April 1939 and stretched  from Paris to its end in a velodrome in Roubaix. The winner was Émile Masson Jr. from Belgium.

Results

References

Paris–Roubaix
Paris–Roubaix
Paris–Roubaix
Paris–Roubaix